Ilisu State Reserve was established on the area of  in 1987 in Qakh Rayon, Azerbaijan. It aims to protect natural complexes of southern slopes of Major Caucasus, to preserve rare and endangered flora and fauna, to restore forests and prevent erosion of soil and flood. The reserve accounts for 500 plant species with nearly 60 species of endemic ones. One can come across such animals as roe deer, wild boar and chamois.

See also

 Nature of Azerbaijan
 National Parks of Azerbaijan
 State Reserves of Azerbaijan
 State Game Reserves of Azerbaijan

References

State reserves of Azerbaijan